Highway 24, also known as the Little Fort Highway or the Interlakes Highway, is a  east-west connection between the Cariboo Highway, just south of 100 Mile House, and the Southern Yellowhead Highway at Little Fort.  It practically provides a "second-chance" route to travellers heading east from Vancouver who missed the route to the northern part of the province or toward Edmonton. 

Although a rural gravel road did exist between 93 Mile House and Little Fort previously, construction under the Highway 24 name on the modern route did not begin until 1974. A dirt highway was open by 1977. Paving and auxiliary feature installation was complete by 1981.

Route description

Highway 24 straddles the boundary between the Cariboo and Thompson-Nicola Regional Districts.  It begins in the west at 93 Mile House, approximately 11 km (7 mi) south of 100 Mile House.  After 9 km (6 mi), it passes through the small community of Lone Butte. After passing several turn-offs to resort lakes including Sheridan Lake, the highway passes through the community of Bridge Lake, 38 km (24 mi) later. The highway then proceeds another 50 km (31 mi) east through the forest and over a large hill before reaching its terminus in Little Fort.

A very scenic drive, the highway follows a historic trail used by the Shuswap people as a trade route and was later developed by the Hudson's Bay Company in the early 19th century to bring furs from northern BC out to Fort Kamloops and the Columbia River.

See also
Hudson's Bay Brigade Trail
 Numbered Routes in British Columbia

Notes

External links

The Fishing Highway area information

024
Interior of British Columbia
Cariboo
Thompson Country